And If is an album by pianist and composer Anat Fort recorded in Norway in 2009 and released on the ECM label in 2010.

Reception

The AllMusic review by Michael G. Nastos states "Anat Fort's second project for ECM follows along the spiritual and meditative lines of her first recording A Long Story. Here the pianist from Israel uses shorter, thematic forms that glide gently toward their conclusions, beautifully flowered, and crafted with light colors... And If suggests Fort's roots in her native Middle East are merging toward American influences with increasing depth". Writing for The Guardian reviewer John Fordham observed "It's an attractive mix, played with an immaculate touch, but Fort's child-song simplicities might make it a bit coy for hardliners". Writing for All About Jazz, Dan McClenaghan noted "Her sophomore And If is every bit as beautiful and more personal, delivering on the promises made by Fort's wonderful debut".

Track listing
All compositions by Anat Fort
 "Paul Motian (1)" - 4:02   
 "Clouds Moving" - 5:35   
 "En If" - 5:54   
 "Some" - 5:40   
 "Something 'Bout Camels" - 9:51   
 "If" - 1:18   
 "Lanesboro" - 5:15   
 "Minnesota" - 7:34   
  "Nu" - 2:50   
 "Paul Motian (2)" - 4:00

Personnel
 Anat Fort — piano
 Gary Wang — double bass 
 Roland Schneider - drums

References

ECM Records albums
Anat Fort albums
2010 albums
Albums produced by Manfred Eicher